This is a list of bridges and tunnels on the National Register of Historic Places in the U.S. state of Washington.

See also
List of bridges in Washington

References

 
Washington, bridges
Bridges on the National Register of Historic Places
Bridges on the National Register of Historic Places